"Haunted" is a 1986 single by The Pogues. It was featured on the Sid and Nancy Soundtrack, the original soundtrack for the movie Sid and Nancy. It reached chart position #42 in the UK. Originally sung by Cait O'Riordan, in 1995 the song was re-recorded as a duet between former Pogues vocalist Shane MacGowan and Sinéad O'Connor for the Two If by Sea/Stolen Hearts soundtrack, this time reaching #30 in the UK. The original version was included on disc 1 of the 2008 compilation "Just Look Them In The Eye And Say... POGUE MAHONE!!"

Personnel
 Spider Stacy – vocals, tin whistle
 Jem Finer – banjo, mandola, saxophone, hurdy-gurdy, guitar, vocals
 James Fearnley – accordion, mandolin, piano, guitar
 Shane MacGowan – vocals, guitar, banjo, bodhrán
 Andrew Ranken – drums, percussion, harmonica, vocals
 Darryl Hunt – bass guitar
 Terry Woods – mandolin, cittern, concertina, guitar, vocals
 Cait O'Riordan – bass, vocals
 Philip Chevron – guitar, vocals

Chart performance

The Pogues version

Shane MacGowan & Sinead O'Connor version

References

External links

1986 songs
The Pogues songs
Male–female vocal duets
Folk rock songs
Songs written by Shane MacGowan